The Ratha Yatra of Puri, also rendered as the Ratha Jatra is a Hindu festival associated with the deity Jagannath held at Shri Kshetra Puri Dham in the state of Odisha, India. It is the oldest Ratha Yatra, whose descriptions can be found in Brahma Purana, Padma Purana, the Skanda Purana, and the Kapila Samhita. This Ratha Yatra is the celebration of the occasion of the deity Jagannath, a form of the Hindu deity Vishnu or Krishna, journeying towards his aunt's house. Adherents mark this occasion as Jagannath's annual visit to the Gundicha Temple via Mausi Maa Temple (maternal aunt's home) near Saradha Bali, Puri.

This annual festival is celebrated on the Ashadha Shukla Paksha Dvitiya, the second day in bright fortnight of Ashadha month of the Odia Calendar.

Description

RATHA YATRA, the Festival of Chariots: Chariots of Shri Jagannath is celebrated every year at Puri, the temple town in Odisha, on the second (dwitiya) day of shukla pakshya (waxing cycle of moon) of Āshādha Māsa (3rd month of Odia calendar). The presiding deities of the Jagannath Temple, Puri's main temple, Jagannath, Balabhadra and Goddess Subhadra, with the celestial wheel- Sudarshana Chakra (ସୁଦର୍ଶନ ଚକ୍ର) are removed from the temple in a ceremonial procession to their chariots. The huge, colourfully decorated chariots are drawn by multitude of devotees on the bada danda, the grand avenue to the Gundicha Temple (Gundicha– King Indradyumna's Queen), two miles away to the North. On the way the chariot of Jagannatha, Nandighosa (ନନ୍ଦିଘୋଷ) waits near the crematorium of Bhakta Salabega (ଭକ୍ତ ସାଲବେଗ), a Muslim devotee, to pay him tribute.

On their way back from the Gundicha Temple, the three deities stop for a while near the Mausi Maa Temple (Aunt's abode) and have an offering of the Poda Pitha, which is a special type of pancake supposed to be the deity's favourite. After a stay of seven days, the deities return to their abode.

The Chariots 
The three chariots of Jagannath, Balabhadra and Subhadra are newly constructed every year with wood of specified trees like phassi, dhausa, etc. They are customarily brought from the ex-princely state of Dasapalla by a specialist team of carpenters who have hereditary rights and privileges for the same. The logs are traditionally set afloat as rafts in the river Mahanadi. These are collected near Puri and then transported by road.

The three chariots are decorated as per the unique scheme prescribed and followed for centuries stand on the Bada Danda, the Grand Avenue. The chariots are lined across the wide avenue in front of the temple close to its eastern entrance, which is also known as the Sinhadwara or the Lion's Gate.

Around each of the chariots are nine Parsva devatas, painted wooden images representing different deities on the chariots' sides. Each chariot has a charioteer (Sarathi) and four horses.

Chandana Yatra

The construction of the chariots starts on Akshaya Trutiya, the third day of the bright fortnight of Vaisakha, with ritual fire worship. This takes place in front of the palace of the King of Puri and opposite the main office of the Puri temple. On this day, the new agricultural season starts and farmers start plowing their fields. This day also marks the beginning of the summer festival of the deities, also known as the sandalwood festival or Chandan Yatra, which lasts for three weeks. In this festival, the representative images of the presiding deities are taken out in colorful processions and given a ceremonial boat ride in the Narendra pokhari/tank every day. In an interesting demonstration of the assimilative character of the Jagannatha cult, Madanmohana and Rama-Krishna, representing Jagannatha & Balarama partake in the festival with the representatives' images of the presiding deities of five main Shiva temples of Puri. These are curiously known as Pancha Pandava, the five brothers of the Mahabharata story. Later the deities have a ritual bath in a small temple in the middle of the tank, in stone tubs filled with water, sandalwood paste, scents, and flowers.

This sandalwood festival culminates in the Snana Yatra, the Bathing Festival on the full moon day of the month of Jestha. On this day, the presiding deities descend from their seats on an elevated platform in the sanctum sanctorum(Garbha gruha), the bejeweled throne. They are bathed in 108 pots of water brought from the suna kua, the golden well and assume the elephant form on the special platform, close to the Eastern boundary wall of the temple. From that day the deities remain in symbolic and ritual convalescence for about two weeks. They are barred from the view of the ordinary devotees. Only three special patta chitras, traditional Oriya paintings of natural colors on cloth stiffened with starch, known as Anasara Pattis, are strung on a bamboo screen hiding the deities from public view, can be seen by the public. During this period, the deities are given only roots, leaves, berries and fruits to cure them of their indisposition. This ritual is a reminder of the strong tribal elements in the genesis and evolution of the Jagannatha cult. The progeny of Lalita, daughter of the original tribal worshipper Biswabasu, chieftain of hunters, and the Brahmin priest Vidyapati, are known as daitapatis or daitas. They have the almost exclusive privilege of serving the deityduring the convalescence and through the entire period of Ratha Jatra or the Festival of Chariots.

Suna Besha(ସୁନା ବେଶ) 

After the chariots of the deities return to the main temple from the Gundicha temple, the deities are attired in gold ornaments and worshipped on the chariots. This celebration is known as Suna Besha. Tradition maintains that this event was first started by King Kapilendra Deb in 1460, when after returning victorious from war he donated gold to Jagannath. The deities are adorned with gold jewelry weighing nearly 208  kg. In 2014 nearly nine hundred thousand devotees witnessed this event held on 9 July

The Ratha Yatra and Pahandi of 2015 
Lakhs of devotees thronged the coastal town of Puri to catch the glimpse of deities re-embodied after 19 years on chariots on the occasion of Rath Yatra, marking largest-ever religious congregation in Odisha.

International Ratha Yatra 

The Ratha Yatra festival has become a common sight in most major cities of the world since 1968 through the ISKCON Hare Krishna movement. By the mercy of Mahaprabhu Shri Jagannath and Chaitanya, A. C. Bhaktivedanta Swami Prabhupada had successfully transplanted the festival which now happens on an annual basis in places all over the world in over 108 cities including; Moscow, New York, Houston, Atlanta, London, Rome, Zürich, Kolkata, Mumbai, Karachi, Berlin, Heidelberg, Cologne, Florence, Wroclaw, Sydney, Perth, Kampala, Nairobi, Mombasa, Kisumu, Mexico City, Dublin, Belfast, Manchester, Birmingham, Alchevsk, Buenos Aires, Madrid, Stockholm, Bath, Budapest, Auckland, Melbourne, Montreal, Paris, Copenhagen, Amsterdam, Los Angeles, Toronto, Vancouver, Santiago, Tallinn, Lima, Antwerp, Sofia, Kuala Lumpur, Dubai, Oslo, Zhongshan, Myitkyina, Bangkok and many other cities. The Ratha Yatra in Dhamrai, Bangladesh, is one of the most important in Bangladesh.

Ratha Yatra dates 

This table shows the dates for Ratha Yatra held in Puri, Odisha. These dates shows from the Year Nabakalebara, 2015 to the Year of next (After 19 years) Nabakalebara, 2034.

Service offerings 
Jagannath temple employs different kinds of sevakas who offer their services on the Ratha.
 Suara
 Mahasuara
 Dahuka: Ratha dahuka boli (also "Dahuka gita" (ଡାହୁକ ଗୀତ)) which are poetic recitations. Ratha Yatra being a symbolic expression of fertility and Life cycle, these "boli" sung by the Dahuka contain bawdy songs. It is believed that unless the Dahuka boli is sung 'Ratha' does not move. These songs are sung publicly without any kind of hold on the lyrics. Dahuka controls the movement of Ratha during the festival.
 Daita pati
 Puspalaka
 Banati Players: Banati is an age-old art, in which a person spins balls set on fire and tied to the ends of a rope. Every year during the Rath yatra devotees perform "Banati" to appease Jagannath. Knives and fireballs, which are attached to the Banati add colour to the procession of the deity as it reaches its destination

Hera Panchami
Hera Panchami is a ritual observed during the period of Rath Yatra in the Grand Jagannath Temple of Puri. It is known as a ritual of Goddess Lakshmi. The fifth day from Rath Yatra, i.e., the fifth day in bright fortnight of Ashadha is known as the Hera Panchami.
During Ratha Yatra, lord Jagannath comes out on a divine outing with his brother Sri Balabhadra and sister Maa Subhadra along with his divine weapon Sri Sudarshana, leaving behind His wife Mahalaxmi. The Goddess expresses her anger for the deity. She proceeds to the Gundicha Temple, the Adapa Mandapa in a palanquin in the form of a Subarna Mahalaxmi and threatens Him to come back to the temple at the earliest. To make Her pleased, the deityconcedes to Her by offering her  (a garland of consent). Seeing the Goddess furious, the sevakas close the main door of the Gundicha. Mahalaxmi returns to the main temple through the Nakachana gate.  In a unique ritual, the Goddess orders one of her attendants to damage a part of the Nandighosa chariot. This is followed by her hiding behind a tamarind tree outside the Gundicha Temple. After some time, she escapes to her home temple in secrecy, through a separate path way known as Hera Gohri Lane The unique ritual is enjoyed by lakhs of devotees of Jagannath.

The rituals of Hera Panchami as an important function of Srimandira finds mention in Skanda Purana. According to the history of the Temple, this "utsav" started during the time of Maharaja Kapilendra Deb. Before his reign, the Hera Panchami function was being observed in a symbolic way with recitation of Mantras.As stated in Madala Panji, Raja Kapilendra Deb substituted this practice with the introduction of an idol of Mahalaxmi made of gold and making the celebration more realistic.

See also
 Famous Hindu yatras
 Hindu pilgrimage sites in India
 List of Hindu festivals
 Padayatra
 Ratha Yatra
 Tirtha
 Tirtha and Kshetra
 Section-"Ratha Yatra rituals"

References

External links

 Orissa government publication on the event

Odia culture
Festivals in Jagannath
Puri
Religious festivals in India
Hindu festivals